Sex & Fury is a 1973 Japanese action-thriller  film directed by Norifumi Suzuki and starring Reiko Ike.

It was followed by Female Yakuza Tale: Inquisition and Torture in the same year.

Plot
The film tells the story of a female petty criminal, played by Reiko Ike, who becomes involved in international intrigue while searching for the sister of a man she saw murdered in a gambling den, as well as the gangsters responsible for murdering her father during her childhood.

Cast
 Reiko Ike as Ochō Inoshika
 Akemi Negishi as Ogin Shitateya
 Ryōko Ema as Omiya
 Yōko Hori as Okinu
 Naomi Oka as Okoi
 Katsumasa Uchida
 Rena Ichinose as Osayo Igirisu
 Tatsuo Endō 
 Yōko Mihara as Yaeji
 Christina Lindberg as Christina

Production
According to Christina Lindberg, while on a plane to Stockholm, she was approached by two Japanese men who asked her if she would be interested in working in Japan. Her reply was "why not" and soon afterwards she was in Japan working for Toei. She spent two and a half months in Japan, appearing in Sex and Fury and later in a larger role in Sadao Nakajima's 1973 film, Porno Queen: Japan Sex Tour.

Availability

The film was made available for U.S. audiences when Panic House released it on region 1 DVD on September 27, 2005.

References

External links 
 
 
 
 Review at ReelBad

1973 films
1970s exploitation films
Films directed by Norifumi Suzuki
1970s Japanese-language films
Toei Pinky Violence
Toei Company films
Yakuza films
1970s thriller drama films
1973 drama films
1970s Japanese films